Separ Deh (also Romanized as Sepār Deh; also known as Sebār Deh) is a village in Eshkevar Rural District, in the Central District of Ramsar County, Mazandaran Province, Iran. At the 2006 census, its population was 381, in 115 families.

References 

Populated places in Ramsar County